The Liberty Tree Mall is a shopping mall in Danvers, Massachusetts, U.S., managed by the Simon Property Group. It is anchored by Kohl's, Total Wine & More, AMC Theatres, Marshalls, Old Navy, and Best Buy, along with one vacant anchor left by A.C. Moore.

Simon Property Group owns one third of the common area of the mall, between Kohl's and Best Buy; the right-hand area of the property from Best Buy to Staples is owned by Target; and the property from Kohl's to Dick's Sporting Goods is owned by New England Development, the mall's original developer.

History 
Construction began in 1969, and the mall opened with a dedication ceremony on February 21, 1972. The mall was renovated and expanded first in 1980 and again in 1993. The mall is located less than a mile away from the Northshore Mall in Peabody, although both malls are primarily owned and managed by Simon Property Group. Since the 1980s, the Liberty Tree Mall has focused more on the discount end, whereas the Northshore Mall has focused on the mainstream/upscale end, thus enabling them to coexist semi-peacefully. Ann & Hope, one of the former anchor stores of the mall, opened in 1969 before the mall was completed. Lechmere was the mall's other anchor, which opened with the rest of the mall in 1972.

The name Liberty Tree derives from the local version of Boston's Liberty Tree, which originally stood in downtown Boston. During the early years of the mall, a large metal tree stood at the center court to commemorate the Liberty Tree. The sculpture was a featured exhibit in the New England Pavilion at the 1964–65 New York World's Fair and was designed by Albert Surman, who died in 2010. The sculpture was removed in 1992 to make room for renovations to the mall and was later scrapped in 1993.

In 1980, a food court was added that included restaurants such as The Roast House and The Fairgrounds. A Marshalls was added during the 1980s, and has been in the mall since then. Marshalls is the only remaining original anchor store. Filene's Basement, which subleased a portion of the Lechmere space in 1983, moved to the Northshore Mall in the 1990s. Sports Authority and Old Navy were added after the 1993 food court-hallway expansion. Sports Authority closed in 2016, after the company filed for bankruptcy, and was replaced with SkyZone.

Lechmere and Filene's Basement were anchor stores of the mall until 1997 when they were demolished and rebuilt into Target, Staples, Dollar Tree, and Best Buy in 1998–99. An f.y.e. replaced part of an area of smaller stores, converting them into a music store/video arcade (formerly Dream Machine), both of which have since closed. Another group of stores was converted to Bed Bath & Beyond.

Ann & Hope closed their entire chain of stores in 2001, and this included the Liberty Tree Mall location.  This location was later rebuilt into Kohl's. Stop & Shop and Pier 1 Imports were later built to the left of Kohl's. A Loews Theatres 20-screen multiplex was also added to the mall.

In January 2008, Stop & Shop closed. The  store was originally built in 2003. The former Stop & Shop space was converted for use by Nordstrom Rack and Off Broadway Shoe Warehouse, which opened in November 2008. In 2009, the former f.y.e. was replaced by a Steve & Barry's, which stayed open until the company filed for bankruptcy.

In early 2013, PPE Casino Resorts applied to the state gambling commission for a slots parlor in the rear area of the mall, where Marshalls and the food court are located now. The announcement led to some debate, with some concerned about the character of the mall and others optimistic about jobs and revenue a slots parlor could generate for the community.

On November 25, 2019, it was announced that A.C. Moore would close all 145 locations, including the location at Liberty Tree Mall.

In May 2020, Pier 1 Imports announced that it would be closing all locations and going out of business due to bankruptcy.

On August 10, 2022, it was reported that the Liberty Tree Mall was up for sale, and had been listed since July of that year.

List of anchor stores

References

External links 

 http://www.simon.com/mall/liberty-tree-mall

Shopping malls in Massachusetts
Buildings and structures in Essex County, Massachusetts
Tourist attractions in Essex County, Massachusetts
Shopping malls established in 1972
Simon Property Group